China Aviation Industry General Aircraft (CAIGA) is a Chinese aircraft manufacturer headquartered in  Zhuhai, Guangdong. It was established as a division of the state-owned Aviation Industry Corporation of China (AVIC) in July 2009.

The company purchased the assets of the bankrupt Epic Aircraft in 2010, forming a partnership with the LT Builders Group operate the company under a judge's ordered deal. CAIGA sold its stake in Epic to the Russian company Engineering LLC in March 2012.

In 2011, CAIGA purchased the American Cirrus Aircraft company.

Aircraft 

Products produced by Cirrus Aircraft are not included here

References

Aircraft manufacturers of China
Companies based in Zhuhai